Danielle Julia Marcano (born August 20, 1997) is an American professional soccer player who plays as a forward for Fenerbahçe S.K. in the Turkish Women's Football Super League.

Early life 
Danielle Julia Marcano was born to Michael Marcano and his wife Lora in Red Bank, New Jersey, United States, on August 20, 1997. She has an older brother Ryan who also played college soccer.

Marcano attended the private Greater Atlanta Christian School in Norcross, Georgia, where she scored 70 goals for her high school team. She was named GHSA Girl's Soccer Player of the Year in 2014 and 2015. Between 2015 and 2018, Marcano studied psychology at the University of Tennessee.

College career 

Marcano played college soccer with the Tennessee Volunteers from 2015 to 2018 with 76 total appearances, scoring 16 goals including six game-winners, and making seven assists. 

Initially a wing-back, Marcano was moved to forward in 2017. During the first round of the 2017 NCAA Division I tournament, she scored the winning goal against Murray State in the 60th minute after coming off the bench to replace the Lady Vols' leading scorer, Khadija Shaw, who was injured in the first three minutes.

During the 2018 NCAA Division I women's soccer tournament, Marcano scored twice against University of Arizona, including the winning goal with 55 seconds left in the game, sending the University of Tennessee to the Sweet 16 for the first time since 2007. In the third round, Marcano scored twice again, this time against No. 16-ranked Texas A&M, helping to send UT to the NCAA quarterfinals for the first time ever. She was named the Player of the Week by TopDrawerSoccer.com in November 2018.

Professional career

Icelandic clubs 
In April 2021, she signed a professional contract with the Icelandic club HK Kópavogur  to play in the 1. deild karla. She scored six goals in 12 games. In 2022, she transferred to the 2. deild karla-club Thróttur Reykjavík, where she capped in 15 league games and in one cup match scoring nine goals in total.

Fenerbahçe 
In October 2022, Marcano moved to Turkey, and signed with the Istanbul-based club Fenerbahçe S.K. to play in the 2022–23 Women's Super League.

International career 
During her high school years, Marcano was part of the U.S. national U-14 player pool, and called up to camp in August 2011. In February 2013, she was part of the U.S. women's national U-17 soccer team camp.

Honors 
During her career, she was honored with following awards:

Youth 
Georgia High School Association (GHSA) State League
 Greater Atlanta Christian School
Champions (2): 2012, 2014.

Individual 
 GHSA Girl's Soccer Player of the Year for all classifications (2014)
 ''GHSA Class AA Girl's Soccer Player of the Year (2015)

References 

1997 births
Living people
People from Red Bank, New Jersey
University of Tennessee alumni
Tennessee Volunteers women's soccer players
Women's association football forwards
Sportspeople from Monmouth County, New Jersey
Soccer players from New Jersey
American women's soccer players
American expatriate sportspeople in Iceland
Expatriate women's footballers in Iceland
Knattspyrnufélagið Þróttur players
American expatriate sportspeople in Turkey
Expatriate women's footballers in Turkey
Turkish Women's Football Super League players
Fenerbahçe S.K. women's football players